Robert Andrew Carnegie, 13th Earl of Northesk (24 June 1926 – 26 January 1994), was a British landowner, farmer and hereditary peer. He was the son of John Carnegie, 12th Earl of Northesk, and Dorothy May Campion.

Carnegie was educated at Pangbourne Nautical College and Tabor Academy, Massachusetts. He served in the Royal Navy 1942–1945. He was an amateur racing driver (racing as "Robin Carnegie") and raced at Le Mans and in the Mille Miglia. In the 1970s he moved to the Isle of Man where he bred Charolais cattle and exported them throughout the world.

On 20 July 1949, he married Jean Margaret MacRae, daughter of Captain John Duncan George MacRae and Lady Phyllis Hervey, daughter of the 4th Marquess of Bristol. They had four children:
Ian Robert MacRae Carnegie (9 April 1950 – 19 November 1951)
Lady Karen Jean Carnegie (22 December 1951); married Patrick Vavasseur Fisher, 4th Baron Fisher.
Mary Barbara Carnegie (10 February 1953); married William Patrick Stirling Damerell.
David John MacRae Carnegie, 14th Earl of Northesk (3 November 1954 – 28 March 2010)

References

NORTHESK, 13th Earl of, Who Was Who, A & C Black, 1920–2016 (online edition, Oxford University Press, 2014)

External links

1926 births
1994 deaths
People educated at Pangbourne College
Robert
Younger sons of earls